Liu Yuxin (born March 13, 1988) is a Chinese actress and model. She is best known for her role as Gororo Mingyu in the 2011 television series Scarlet Heart. She graduated from the Central Academy of Drama.

Biography
Liu bought and owned the rights of the novel, Three Lives Three Worlds, The Pillow Book, and had wanted to play the role of Feng Jiu. However, after Eternal Love became popular following its broadcast, audiences condemned her decision and rallied for Dilraba Dilmurat to play Feng Jiu instead. Following this, Liu attempted suicide in August 2018, with netizens speculating that it was related to her divorce from her husband, who had cheated on her with actress Zhang Meng while Liu was pregnant.  She later sold the rights of the book to Tencent Video, who cast her as Ji Heng in Eternal Love of Dream instead and made her one of the co-producers. Criticism of her performance led to her attempting suicide again. Since then, Liu has changed her name from Liu Yuxin to Liu Yuefei.

Filmography

Film

Television series

References

External links 
 
  Liu Yuxin's blog on Sina.com
  Liu Yuxin's blog on Sohu.com

Living people
1988 births
Actresses from Hunan
Central Academy of Drama alumni
21st-century Chinese actresses  
Chinese television actresses 
Chinese film actresses